The Blue Line is a planned light rail line for connecting Austin–Bergstrom International Airport with downtown Austin, Texas. It is still in the planning stages as a part of Capital Metro's Project Connect. It is estimated to begin revenue service as early as 2029.

History

Austin's 2013 East Riverside Corridor Plan called for high-capacity transit to be installed along East Riverside Drive. This became part of the original Blue Line, which failed to find support in 2014 and was shelved. The Gold Line was formed from a segment of this original proposal, and is expected to be built as a separate bus rapid transit line.

In 2018, Capital Metro announced a new long-range planning project entitled Project Connect that outlines several major transit corridors consisting of commuter rail, light rail, and bus rapid transit. The Blue Line corridor will include a transit pathway for a light rail or bus rapid transit line running on the west side of Downtown Austin to Austin–Bergstrom International Airport in southeast Austin. The line was included as part of the Project Connect referendum during the 2020 United States presidential election.

Proposed route

A new bridge over Lady Bird Lake is planned to carry the line into the Downtown Transit Tunnel.

Stations are listed south to north, from Austin–Bergstrom International Airport to the North Lamar Transit Center:

References

External links
Map and fact sheet A
Fact sheet B

Light rail in Texas
Rail transportation in Austin, Texas
Transportation in Travis County, Texas
Austin–Bergstrom International Airport
Airport rail links in the United States
Capital Metro
Proposed railway lines in Texas
2029 in rail transport